Constituency NA-98 (Gujranwala-IV) was a constituency for the National Assembly of Pakistan. After the 2018 delimitation, its constituent areas have been divided into the surrounding newly delineated constituencies of Gujranwala. This was done because the district lost 1 National Assembly seat after the population count of the 2017 census.

Election 2002 

General elections were held on 10 Oct 2002. Imtiaz Safdar of PPP won by 45,655 votes.

Election 2008 

General elections were held on 18 Feb 2008. Imtiaz Safdar of PPP won by 68,509 votes.

Election 2013 

General elections were held on 11 May 2013. Mian Tariq Mehmood of PML-N won by 118,832 votes and became the  member of National Assembly.

References

External links
 Election result's official website

NA-098
Abolished National Assembly Constituencies of Pakistan